Rhinogobio typus is a species of cyprinid fish. It is endemic to China.

References

typus
Cyprinid fish of Asia
Freshwater fish of China
Endemic fauna of China
Fish described in 1871
Taxa named by Pieter Bleeker